Anacampseros L. is a genus comprising about a hundred species of small perennial succulent plants native to Southern Africa, Ethiopia and Latin America. The botanical name Anacampseros is an ancient one for herbs supposed to restore lost love.

The Australian species 	Grahamia australiana was at one time included in the genus Anacampseros, but the entire genus now is regarded as Southern African, and no longer includes any Australian representatives.

Description
Plants in the genus Anacampseros are perennial. In habit they are small undershrubs or sprawling herbs that may form dense mats. Mature plants of many of the species form a small caudex or a tuberous root-stock. The leaves of most species are succulent and may be either lanceolate in shape or rounded.  
The arrangement of leaves on a stem is alternate. The leaves in most species are closely spaced, and in some species they are small and more or less hidden by papery or filamentous fascicled stipules. Some species have sessile flowers, often in an involucre. Other species bear their flowers on racemose peduncles. In contrast to the alternately born leaves, the bracts are opposite and scarious. The flowers are actinomorphic with two caducous sepals and five fugacious petals.  The petals may be white, pink, or even pale purple. The plants flower from time to time in summer, and open on sunny days only. The numerous stamens are attached to the bases of the petals. The style is split into three. The ovary is superior, and ripens into a three-valved unilocular capsule that contains many seeds on  a free-standing central placenta. In some species the three valves are misleadingly split into six valves. The seeds are compressed and may be angled or have three wings.

Taxonomy
Anacampseros is now a genus in the family Anacampserotaceae, whereas until about 2010 it had been considered a member of Portulacaceae.

Anacampseros Mill. is a synonym of the genus Sedum, which is in a different plant family, Crassulaceae.

Species
The following species were listed as accepted in the Kew Gardens Plant list at the start of 2016.

Anacampseros affinis  H.Pearson & Stephens 
Anacampseros albidiflora  Poelln. 
Anacampseros albissima  Marloth 
Anacampseros alstonii  Schönland 
Anacampseros alta  Poelln. 
Anacampseros arachnoides  (Haw.) Sims 
Anacampseros bayeriana  S.A.Hammer 
Anacampseros coahuilensis  (S.Watson) Eggli & Nyffeler 
Anacampseros comptonii  Pillans 
Anacampseros crinita  Dinter 
Anacampseros decipiens  Poelln. 
Anacampseros densifolia  Dinter ex Poelln. 
Anacampseros depauperata  (A.Berger) Poelln. 
Anacampseros dielsiana  Dinter 
Anacampseros dinteri  Schinz 
Anacampseros filamentosa  (Haw.) Sims 
Anacampseros fissa  Poelln. 
Anacampseros gracilis  Poelln. 
Anacampseros herreana  Poelln. 
Anacampseros hillii  G.Will. 
Anacampseros karasmontana  Dinter 
Anacampseros kurtzii  Bacig. 
Anacampseros lanceolata  (Haw.) Sweet 
Anacampseros lanigera  Burch. 
Anacampseros mallei  (G.Will.) G.Will. 
Anacampseros marlothii  Poelln. 
Anacampseros meyeri  Poelln. 
Anacampseros namaquensis  H.Pearson & Stephens 
Anacampseros nebrownii  Poelln. 
Anacampseros nitida  Poelln. 
Anacampseros papyracea  E.Mey. ex Fenzl 
Anacampseros papyracea  subsp. namaensis Gerbaulet 
Anacampseros paradoxa  Poelln. 
Anacampseros parviflora  Poelln. 
Anacampseros pisina  G.Will. 
Anacampseros prominens  G.Will. 
Anacampseros quinaria  E.Mey. ex Fenzl 
Anacampseros recurvata  Schönland 
Anacampseros recurvata  subsp. buderiana (Poelln.) Gerbaulet 
Anacampseros recurvata  subsp. minuta Gerbaulet 
Anacampseros retusa  Poelln. 
Anacampseros rhodesica  N.E.Br. 
Anacampseros rubroviridis  Poelln. 
Anacampseros rufescens  (Haw.) Sweet 
Anacampseros ruschii  Dinter & Poelln. 
Anacampseros schoenlandii  Poelln. 
Anacampseros scopata  G.Will. 
Anacampseros starkiana  Poelln. 
Anacampseros subnuda  Poelln. 
Anacampseros subnuda  subsp. lubbersii (Bleck) Gerbaulet 
Anacampseros telephiastrum  DC. 
Anacampseros tomentosa  A.Berger 
Anacampseros truncata  Poelln. 
Anacampseros ustulata  E.Mey. ex Fenzl 
Anacampseros vanthielii  G.Will. 
Anacampseros variabilis  Poelln. 
Anacampseros vespertina  Thulin 
Anacampseros vulcanensis  Añon 
Anacampseros wischkonii  Dinter & Poelln.

Uses and significance
Folk uses and views on the genus are incoherent and regional. Some species are regarded as narcotic or outright poisonous, but tests on sheep gave no positive result and some of the notionally toxic species are used in adulterating beer. Several species have been used in making various forms of beer, but it is not clear what the intended effect might be, although some species appears to have some activity in hydrolysing some carbohydrates. Some species are used as charms and non-specific "medicines".

References 

 Botanica Sistematica
 
 

 
Caryophyllales genera
Anacampserotaceae